Renan Oliveira may refer to:
 Renan Oliveira (footballer, born 1989), Brazilian footballer
 Renan Oliveira (footballer, born 1997), Brazilian footballer